Vsevolod III Yuryevich, or Vsevolod the Big Nest (1154–1212), was Grand Prince of Vladimir from 1176 to 1212. During his long reign, the city reached the zenith of its glory.

Family
Vsevolod was the tenth or eleventh son of Yuri Dolgoruky (c. 1099 – 1157), who founded the town Dmitrov to commemorate the site of Vsevolod's birth. Nikolai Karamzin (1766 – 1826) initiated the speculation identifying Vsevolod's mother Helene as a Greek princess, because after her husband's death she took Vsevolod with her to Constantinople.

Vsevolod spent his youth at the chivalric court of the Komnenoi. On his return from the Byzantine Empire to Rus' in 1170, Vsevolod supposedly visited Tbilisi, as a local chronicle records that that year the Georgian king entertained his  nephew from Constantinople and married him to his relative, an Ossetian princess.

Reign
In 1173 two Smolensk princes captured Kiev (Kyiv), captured Vsevolod and briefly installed him on the throne. Ransomed a year later, Vsevolod took his brother Mikhalko's side in his struggle against the powerful boyars of Rostov and Suzdal. Upon Mikhalko's death in 1176, Vsevolod succeeded him in Vladimir. He promptly subjugated the boyars and systematically raided the Volga peoples, notably Volga Bulgaria. He installed puppet rulers on the throne of Novgorod and married his daughters to princes of Chernigov and Kiev.

Vsevolod showed little mercy to those who disobeyed his commands. In 1180 and 1187 he punished the princes of Ryazan by ousting them from their lands. In 1207 he burnt to the ground both Ryazan and Belgorod. His military fame spread quickly. The Tale of Igor's Campaign, thought to be written during Vsevolod's reign, addresses him thus: "Great prince Vsevolod! Don't you think of flying here from afar to safeguard the paternal golden throne of Kiev? For you can with your oars scatter in drops the Volga, and with your helmets scoop dry the Don."

But Kievan matters concerned Vsevolod little in the latter part of his reign. He concentrated on building up his own capital, Vladimir. His Ossetian wife, Maria Shvarnovna, who devoted herself to works of piety and founded several convents, was glorified by the Russian church as a saint. By her Vsevolod had no fewer than fourteen children, thus earning for himself the sobriquet Big Nest. Four of them, Konstantin, George, Yaroslav and Sviatoslav, succeeded him as Grand Dukes of Vladimir. He died on 12 April 1212 and was buried at the Assumption Cathedral in Vladimir.

Marriage and children
Vsevolod married first Maria, whose origins are disputed. She has been variously identified as Ossetian, Alan and Moravian. They had at least fourteen children:

Sbyslava (Pelagia) Vsevolodovna (born 26 October 1178).
Vseslava Vsevolodovna. Married Rostislav Yaroslavich, Prince of Snovsk. He was a son of Yaroslav II Vsevolodovich, Prince of Chernigov. His paternal grandfather was Vsevolod II of Kiev.
Verchoslava Vsevolodovna. Married Rostislav II of Kiev. 
Konstantin of Rostov (18 May 1186 – 2 February 1218). 
Boris Vsevolodovich. (c. 1187–1238). 
Gleb Vsevolodovich (d. 29 September 1189). 
Yuri II of Vladimir (1189 – 4 March 1238). 
Yaroslav II of Vladimir (8 February 1191 – 30 September 1246). 
Helena Vsevolodovna (d. 1204). 
Vladimir Vsevolodovich, Prince of Yuryev-Polsky (25 October 1192 – 6 January 1227).
Sviatoslav III of Vladimir (27 March 1196 – 3 February 1252).
Ioann Vsevolodovich, Prince of Starodub (28 November 1197 – after 1247). 
Anna Vsevolodovna. Married Vladimir, Prince of Belgorod (d. 1239). 

Maria died in 1205 or 1206. Vsevolod married Liubov Vasilkovna in 1209. She was a daughter of Vasilko Bryacheslavich, Prince of Vitebsk. They had no known children.

Further reading
 Bibliography of the history of the Early Slavs and Rus'
 Bibliography of Russian history (1223–1613)
 List of Slavic studies journals

External links
His listing in "Medieval lands" by Charles Cawley.

1154 births
1212 deaths
Grand Princes of Vladimir
Rurik dynasty
12th-century princes in Kievan Rus'
13th-century princes in Kievan Rus'
Burials at Dormition Cathedral, Vladimir
Eastern Orthodox monarchs
Grand Princes of Kiev